Christopher Dighton or Deighton (1559-1604) was an English politician who sat in the House of Commons between 1601 and 1605.

Dighton was the son of Christopher Dighton (died 1587), a vintner who served as MP for Worcester and bailiff of the city. 

He was elected Member of Parliament for Worcester in 1601, and re-elected in 1604. He sat until his death on 2 August 1604.

References

1559 births
1604 deaths
Members of the Parliament of England for Worcester
English MPs 1601
English MPs 1604–1611